Kirk Baxter (born 1972) is an Australian film editor. He has worked with director David Fincher and editor Angus Wall several times, winning Academy Awards for The Social Network and The Girl with the Dragon Tattoo.

Baxter was raised in Sydney, Australia and commenced his career as an editor there. He had been noted primarily for his work editing commercials, and co-founded a commercial editing firm named Final Cut. In 2004, Baxter joined Angus Wall's firm Rock Paper Scissors, which was also responsible for commercial work. Baxter then worked with Wall as an "additional editor" on Fincher's film Zodiac. When Wall was chosen to edit The Curious Case of Benjamin Button, he proposed to Fincher that Baxter be the co-editor, and they have since worked together on Fincher's subsequent films.

Baxter and Wall were nominated for the Academy Award for Best Film Editing, the BAFTA Award for Best Editing, and the American Cinema Editors Eddie Award for their work on The Curious Case of Benjamin Button. For their work on The Social Network, Baxter and Wall won an Oscar and a BAFTA in 2011. The following year, they won a second Oscar for The Girl with the Dragon Tattoo.

In 2014, Baxter's next edited film was Gone Girl, also directed by David Fincher, and was his first film to not be co-edited by Angus Wall.

Filmography (as editor)

References

External links
.

1972 births
Living people
American Cinema Editors
Australian film editors
Best Editing BAFTA Award winners
Best Film Editing Academy Award winners